Arys Chien (born 1972) is a producer, songwriter and arranger in the Chinese music industry. He is also involved in soundtrack production, recording and mixing. Currently, he produces commercial and film soundtracks in Deepwhite Studio, and handles recording and mixing in Little White Fish Studio. Arys also co-owns a record label A Whiter Day Music, which distributes work for independent artists. In addition, he still releases music as a member in the duo “Deepwhite".

Career

Early career 
After graduating from the Department of Foreign Languages and Literatures at National Taiwan University in 1995, Arys joined Friendly Dog Entertainment as a production assistant. Since 1996, Arys Chien, Junyang Chen and Hua Chen began releasing work under the same pseudonym "Deepwhite", with parenthesis behind to include their English for distinguishing one person from another. For example, Arys Chien's work was signed as "Deepwhite (Arys Chien)".

Since 1997, Arys's works have been selected multiple times for singers under record companies such as Linfair Records, What’s Music International Corp., and Warner Chappell Music. The artists include William Wing Hong So, Kelly Chen, IPIS, Where Chou, Chin Chyi, Valen Hsu, Power Station, Denise Yuen, Miriam Yeung, Sammi Cheng, Stefanie Sun, Na Ying, etc.

In 2005, Arys and his girlfriend Zoe Huang formed the duo "Deepwhite" under Avex Trax, and released two original albums in 2006 and 2007. After the end of their contract with Avex in 2008, Arysserved as the music director in Enjoy Records until 2010, and then resumed to be a freelance songwriter.

Songwriter and producer 
Arys has written lyrics or compositions for over 400 songs so far, including albums by singers like Amei, Kelly Chen, Sammi Cheng, Faye Wong, Stefanie Sun, Angela Chang, Christine Fan, Na Ying, William Wing Hong So, Joey Yung, Rene Liu, Elva Hsiao, Chin Chyi, Eason Chan, Kitty Chan, etc. In addition, Arys has also written Chinese lyrics for many Korean idol groups, such as EXO, NCT Dream, Pentagon and so on.

As for music production, Arys has produced singles or albums for many singers, such as Where Chou, Xian Zi, Sasha Li, Bii, Andrew Tan, Miu Chu, Vivian Hsu, Leheane Palray, Megan Lai, Celest Chong, Chris Ke, Sunny Lin, etc.

In addition to songwriting in the pop music industry, Arys also produces soundtracks for commercials. He now has accumulated more than 200 works including Hennessy's 2014 commercial song “Wo Yuan Xiang Xin 我願相信", JD.com, 7-ELEVEN, HNCB’s annual single “Shou Hu Ni De Chu Zhong 守護你的初衷", Shinkong Mitsukoshi x World Order, McDonald's 2017 single “Power to the M 超麥力", Nike, Toyota, Ford, Nissan, Lexus, Johnson & Johnson Beijing Olympics, CCTV Spring Festival Gala, UnionPay, etc.

His film soundtrack works include “Do You Love Me As I Love You 可不可以，你也剛好喜歡我" in 2020, “Zui Xing 罪‧形" in 2019, Hsien Yung Pai's biography documentary “Multiflorate Splendour 奼紫嫣紅開遍" in 2015, “Return Ticket 到阜陽六百里" in 2011, etc.

Performing career 
Around 2000, Arys asked his girlfriend to sing a demo for him, and several record labels have shown interest in signing them. Thus, the two formed a singer-songwriter group “Deepwhite”, and signed a contract with Avex Trax in 2005. They released two albums,”Deepwhite" in 2006 and “Hua Huo 花火" in 2007.

Other than Deepwhite, Arys also participates as the guitarist and main songwriter in other bands like "GooDDD" and “Ouch Youths".

Entrepreneurship 
In 2017, Arys and KKFARM (now theFARM) jointly established an independent label "A Whiter Day Music". In 2020, he produced and released the new song "Cold Fire" for  "Deepwhite", and also produced and released the work of the hip-hop duo Fun Ones. Fun Ones separated at the end of 2020, but one of the vocals Zing stayed in the label and continues to release new songs in 2021.

Public affairs 
Arys actively participates in organizations that help protect the rights and interests of Taiwanese musicians. In addition to serving as a committee member of the Music Creators Union, Arys works closely with ARCO. He has also served as the panel judge for Golden Melody Awards and the Golden Music Awards, as well as the committee member for various funding projects in the Ministry of Culture.

Artistry 
Arys has his expertise in commercial love songs and allegro songs, especially songs illustrating deeper emotions. Before his true identity was revealed, many people speculated that “Deepwhite” was a female songwriter. He once encouraged young talents to build a lot of emotions, but give and express them very carefully. For example, a piece of lyrics is very concise and condensed in one or two hundred words, yet there are thousands of messages hidden behind them. Writing lyrics is about accumulating, sorting and finally expressing all the thoughts and feelings in words.

Works

References 

Chinese songwriters
1972 births
Living people